Ashland is an unincorporated community in Concordia Parish, Louisiana, United States.

References

Unincorporated communities in Louisiana
Unincorporated communities in Concordia Parish, Louisiana
Unincorporated communities in Natchez micropolitan area